The 2022–23 CONCACAF Nations League A is the top division of the 2022–23 edition of the CONCACAF Nations League, the second season of the international football competition involving the men's national teams of the 41 member associations of CONCACAF. It it is being held from 2 June 2022 to 28 March 2023.

League A will culminate with the 2023 CONCACAF Nations League Finals in June 2023 to crown the champions of the CONCACAF Nations League. These matches will be played at Allegiant Stadium in Paradise, Nevada.

The top eight teams will qualify to the 2023 CONCACAF Gold Cup, and the remaining four teams will enter the 2023 CONCACAF Gold Cup qualification.

Format
League A will consist of twelve teams. The league will be split into four groups of three teams. The teams will compete in a home-and-away, round-robin format over the course of the group phase, with matches being played in the official FIFA match windows in June 2022 and March 2023. The four group winners will qualify for the Nations League Finals, while the four last-placed teams in each group will be relegated to League B for the next edition of the tournament.

Team changes
The following are the team changes of League A from the 2019–20 season:

Seeding
The draw for the league phase took place in Miami, Florida, United States on 4 April 2022, 19:00 EDT. Each of the League's draws began by randomly selecting a team from Pot 1 and placing them in Group A of their respective league. The draws continued by selecting the remaining teams from Pot 1 and positioning them into Groups B, C and D in sequential order. The same procedure was done for the remaining pots. Teams were seeded into pots using CONCACAF Ranking.

Groups
The fixture list was confirmed by CONCACAF on 6 April 2022.

All match times are in EDT (UTC−4) as listed by CONCACAF (local times, if different, are in parentheses).

Group A

Group B

Group C

Group D

Goalscorers

Notes

References

External links

League A